Chandra Mohan s/o S. Thambirajah is a Malaysian politician. He is a senator in the Dewan Negara. He served for the first term from 17 December 2012 to 16 December 2015 and the second term from 17 December 2015 to 16 December 2018.

References

Living people
Date of birth missing (living people)
Democratic Action Party (Malaysia) politicians
Members of the Dewan Negara
Year of birth missing (living people)